Hüti Nature Reserve is a nature reserve which is located in Hiiu County, Estonia.

The protected area was founded in 2013 to protect valuable habitat types and threatened species in Hüti village (former Kõrgessaare Parish).

References

Nature reserves in Estonia
Geography of Hiiu County